Pedro José Moura Duarte Pinto (born 8 January 2000) is a Portuguese professional footballer who plays for Cova da Piedade as a midfielder.

Football career
He made his LigaPro debut for Académica on 5 October 2019 in a game against Benfica B.

References

External links

2000 births
Living people
Portuguese footballers
Association football midfielders
Associação Académica de Coimbra – O.A.F. players
C.D. Cova da Piedade players
Liga Portugal 2 players
Footballers from Lisbon